Malanea is a genus of flowering plants belonging to the family Rubiaceae.

Its native range is Central and Southern Tropical America to Trinidad.

Species
Species:

Malanea auyantepuiensis 
Malanea boliviana 
Malanea campylocarpa 
Malanea centralis 
Malanea chimantensis 
Malanea chocoana 
Malanea ciliolata 
Malanea cruzii 
Malanea cylindrica 
Malanea duckei 
Malanea ecuadorensis 
Malanea egleri 
Malanea erecta 
Malanea evenosa 
Malanea fendleri 
Malanea forsteronioides 
Malanea gabrielensis 
Malanea glabra 
Malanea guaiquinimensis 
Malanea harleyi 
Malanea hirsuta 
Malanea hypoleuca 
Malanea jauaensis 
Malanea martiana 
Malanea microphylla 
Malanea obovata 
Malanea panurensis 
Malanea pariensis 
Malanea ptariensis 
Malanea revolutifolia 
Malanea sanluisensis 
Malanea sarmentosa 
Malanea schomburgkii 
Malanea setulosa 
Malanea sipapoensis 
Malanea spicata 
Malanea subtruncata 
Malanea tafelbergensis 
Malanea ueiensis 
Malanea ursina

References

Rubiaceae
Rubiaceae genera